Mount Cleveland is the highest mountain in Glacier National Park, located in Montana, United States. It is also the highest point in the Lewis Range, which spans part of the northern portion of the park and extends into Canada. The east side of the future national park was purchased by the federal government from the Blackfoot Confederacy in 1895 during the second term of President Grover Cleveland. According to the United States Board on Geographic Names, the mountain is named for the former president.

While not of great absolute elevation (the mountain is more than  lower than Granite Peak, the highest peak in Montana), Mount Cleveland is notable for its large, steep rise above local terrain. The other faces show almost as much vertical relief. This scale and steepness of relief is quite rare in the contiguous United States. Mount Cleveland ranks 50th on the list of peaks in the contiguous U.S. with the greatest topographic prominence. The massif upon which Mount Cleveland is situated also includes  Kaiser Point, which is the seventh-highest peak in the park and is only  to the northeast.

The first recorded ascent of Mount Cleveland was in 1920 by Frank B. Wynn. The easiest route on the peak is the West Face route, starting from the Waterton Valley; it is a Class 3 scramble with the possibility of some short exposed Class 4 sections.

Other routes include the Stoney Indian Route, from Stoney Indian Pass to the south of the peak, first descended by noted Sierra mountaineer Norman Clyde and party in 1937; various routes on the Southeast Face; and the more difficult North (or Northwest) Face, climbed partially in 1971 and completely in 1976.

Although the peak has a relatively low fatality record, five Montana climbers were killed on the peak's west face in December 1969. The climbers were swept away by an avalanche and were not found for seven months.

Climate
Based on the Köppen climate classification, it is located in an alpine subarctic climate zone with long, cold, snowy winters, and cool to warm summers. Temperatures can drop below −10 °F with wind chill factors below −30 °F.

Geology

Like other mountains in Glacier National Park, it is composed of sedimentary rock laid down during the Precambrian to Jurassic periods. The bulk of the peak is composed of limestone of the Siyeh Formation, and the conspicuous dark band on the north face is a diorite sill.

Gallery

See also

List of mountain peaks of North America
List of mountain peaks of the United States
List of Ultras of the United States
List of mountains and mountain ranges of Glacier National Park (U.S.)

References

External links

 
 

Mountains of Glacier County, Montana
Mountains of Glacier National Park (U.S.)
Highest points of United States national parks
Lewis Range
Mountains of Montana
North American 3000 m summits